Darren Wilson (born 21 September 1974) is an Australian rules football boundary umpire. He is also an elite stair climber who won the 2016 Empire State Building Run-Up.

Umpiring career

AFL
Wilson made his Australian Football League debut as a boundary umpire in 1992.

Wilson umpired the 1998 AFL Grand Final between Adelaide and North Melbourne. As of 2010 he had umpired 12 consecutive AFL Grand Finals. Umpiring his twelfth grand in 2009 set a new record for the number of grand finals umpired.

References

1974 births
Australian Football League umpires
Living people